Louis Ange Pitou (April 1767 in Valainville, a commune of Moléans  from Châteaudun – 8 May 1846 in Paris) was a French author and counterrevolutionary.

Biography
He entered the priesthood, but after the beginning of the French Revolution he abandoned his profession. A zealous royalist, he was arrested sixteen times, and finally transported to Guiana under the Directory. Shortly after his arrival at Cayenne he escaped, and after many adventures among the natives he returned to France. He engaged in new conspiracies under the consulate, and was a few years in prison. After the return of the Bourbons, Pitou received a small pension.

Works
He published Relation de mon voyage à Cayenne et chez les anthropophages ("Story of my journey to Cayenne and among the cannibals"; Paris, 1805). This work, although full of inaccuracies, excited the public curiosity, and a second, enlarged edition was published (2 vols., 1808).

Notes

References

External links
 
 

1767 births
1846 deaths
People of the French Revolution
People from Eure-et-Loir
French male writers
French memoirists